Alfred-Valère Roy (3 May 1870 – 23 June 1942) was a Canadian politician.

Born in Bienville (Lévis), Quebec, Roy was educated at the Collège de Lévis, the Séminaire de Québec, and the Université Laval. He became a physician in 1895. He was a surgeon in a hospital in Lévis. A Lieutenant Colonel in the 6e Régiment reserve, he was a member of the Knights of Columbus.

He was elected to the Legislative Assembly of Quebec for Lévis in 1916. A Liberal, he was acclaimed in 1919 and re-elected in 1923 and 1927. He was appointed to the Legislative Council of Quebec for the division of de La Durantaye on November 27, 1930. He served until his death in Lévis. His son Roger Roy was also a politician.

References

1870 births
1942 deaths
Quebec Liberal Party MLCs
Quebec Liberal Party MNAs